Mon State Government is the cabinet of Mon State. The cabinet is led by chief minister, Aye Zan.

The former chief minister, Min Min Oo resigned due to social complications.

Cabinet (April 2016–present)

References 

State and region governments of Myanmar
Mon State